Indrid Cold (aka The Grinning Man) is a mysterious man believed to be connected to the Mothman, first encountered by Woodrow Derenberger. It may also refer to:

 Indrid Cold, a character from the film The Mothman Prophecies
 Indrid Cold, a character from the podcast The Adventure Zone
 Indrid Cold, a character from the video game Fallout 76, added in the "Mutation Invasion" update